Cliff Weitzman is an Israeli-American entrepreneur. He is the founder of Speechify Text To Speech software. In 2017, Weitzman was named to Forbes magazine's 30 Under 30 list. Weitzman is a dyslexia advocate. He could not read as a child.

References 

Living people
American computer programmers
American technology company founders
Brown University alumni
Year of birth missing (living people)
People with dyslexia